Grace Church in Newark (Episcopal) is an active and historic Episcopal Church in the Diocese of Newark. It is located on Newark, New Jersey's Broad Street where it has stood since 1837. Grace is a traditional church that worships in the Catholic tradition. Grace is notable for its architecture, music, and as the birthplace of the tune "America the Beautiful".

History 
Grace Church was founded on Ascension Day in 1837 at the behest of Bishop George Washington Doane. As part of what is today called the Oxford Movement, Grace's founders emphasized the sacramental worship and succession of bishops of the Episcopal Church as their direct link to Christ, the Apostolic community and its Eucharistic worship –a sister to the Roman Catholic Church. A daughter parish of Trinity Church, Bishop Doane explicitly founded the church in the growing city to be the standard bearer for Anglo-Catholicism in the diocese. To this day, Grace's remains dedicated to offering its timeless worship to the city and its people.

The church building, designed by Richard Upjohn, who was also the architect of Trinity Church, New York, was consecrated on October 5, 1848. It is widely esteemed as an outstanding example of Gothic Revival architecture in the United States, and was designated a National Historic Landmark for its architecture in 1987. The church was built on the site of the old Essex County Courthouse and Jail which burnt down on August 15, 1835. The massive, single bell in the tower was an early replacement  for one purchased and installed before the consecration in 1848; the original bell produced a horrible sound, drawing complaints from parishioners and local citizens, and was replaced with a "more agreeable toned bell" purchased by Jermiah C. Garthwaite, one of the 1837 founding members of the church. Paid for by an Episcopalian textile manufacture in Newark, the bell has been rung for many solemn occasions, including to support the Federal soldiers defending Fort Sumter in 1861.

The tune for "America the Beautiful," called "Materna," was written here by the parish organist Samuel A. Ward in 1882.

Today 
Grace remains widely known for its high church, sacramental liturgy, or order of service, at the center of which, in the tradition of the Church as handed down from the Apostles, is the Eucharist. The Eucharist, otherwise known as Holy Communion or the Mass, is Grace's form of weekly worship on Sundays. Grace teaches the Catholic faith, holding that Christians gain access to the Mystical Body of Christ through the sacramental worship of the community and are aided by the sequential liturgy, incense, and Eucharistic sacrifice to an experience of heaven. Incense, lights, and ceremonial vestments are used, which render the liturgy intelligible to all the senses, and the contemporary-language rite from the 1979 Book of Common Prayer (Rite II) is used. Much of the congregation actively participates in the service.

Grace does hold High Mass on occasion, complete with liturgy sung in Latin by the ordained clergy, as it did to celebrate Martin Luther King Jr. Day in January 2020, complete with special music performed by a collective of choirs from Grace Church and other nearby areas in the diocese.

The diverse congregation includes people from Africa and the Caribbean as well as Europeans, Caucasian Americans, and African Americans. Its members are young and old, married and single, gay and straight. The parish is committed to Catholic faith and practice in The Episcopal Church, but is receptive to new insights, including the ordination of women and affirmation of same-sex relationship.

The Rev. Dr. J. Brent Bates became the parish's seventeenth rector in March 2011.

Music 

Music plays an important role in worship, and Grace has always maintained a strong choral tradition in its adult and children's choir. Both choirs perform mass settings throughout the year, and weekly sing the Gregorian Chant mass propers from the early, medieval and renaissance tradition. Grace holds choir concerts and organ recitals on the 48-stop tracker instrument built by Casavant Frères in 1990. The Grace Church Music Society, organized in 2008, each year sponsors a series of recitals and concerts. Tyrone Whiting, an award-winning English organist and conductor and graduate of the Royal College of Music in London, England, is the current Director of Music. He was preceded by Jim Hopkins,  Joe Arndt, and James McGregor, who held the position for forty-eight years.

Masses and services 
Masses are offered on Sundays at 8:00am and 10:30am (High Mass) with Sunday School, and on many weekdays at 12:10pm. Additional family and youth activities are held weekly and forms of worship like Stations of the Cross and Benediction of the Blessed Sacrament are held during Lent.

See also 
 National Register of Historic Places listings in Essex County, New Jersey
 Episcopal Church

References

External links

Official Site
Historical resources from Project Canterbury

National Historic Landmarks in New Jersey
Churches completed in 1847
19th-century Episcopal church buildings
Episcopal church buildings in New Jersey
Churches on the National Register of Historic Places in New Jersey
Churches in Newark, New Jersey
National Register of Historic Places in Newark, New Jersey
New Jersey Register of Historic Places
1837 establishments in New Jersey
Anglo-Catholic church buildings in the United States